Koi Sie Yan (born 8 February 1999) is a Malaysian rhythmic gymnast.

Career 
Sie Yan Koi first competed for Malaysia at an international rhythmic gymnastics championship in 2015 where she represented Malaysia at the 2015 World Rhythmic Gymnastics Championships. Sie Yan Koi also went onto compete at the 2015 Southeast Asian Games and claimed her maiden Southeast Asian Games medal after securing a gold medal in the women's individual all-around event. At the 2017 Southeast Asian Games which was held in her home nation at Kuala Lumpur, she achieved four gold medals and a silver medal in the rhythmic gymnastics events.

She represented Malaysia at the 2018 Commonwealth Games which was her maiden Commonwealth Games appearance and competed in the rhythmic gymnastics discipline. Sie Yan Koi claimed four medals at the 2018 Gold Coast Commonwealth Games including 3 silver medals in the Team, individual ball event and individual clubs event along with a bronze medal in the individual ribbon event.

She was again selected to represented Malaysia at the 2022 Commonwealth Games, ending in 4th in the team event and qualifying for the ribbon final with a score of 25.750.

References 

1999 births
Living people
Malaysian rhythmic gymnasts
Gymnasts at the 2018 Commonwealth Games
Commonwealth Games silver medallists for Malaysia
Commonwealth Games bronze medallists for Malaysia
Commonwealth Games medallists in gymnastics
People from Pahang
Malaysian people of Chinese descent
Southeast Asian Games gold medalists for Malaysia
Southeast Asian Games silver medalists for Malaysia
Southeast Asian Games medalists in gymnastics
Asian Games competitors for Malaysia
Gymnasts at the 2018 Asian Games
Competitors at the 2015 Southeast Asian Games
Competitors at the 2017 Southeast Asian Games
Competitors at the 2019 Southeast Asian Games
Competitors at the 2021 Southeast Asian Games
Competitors at the 2019 Summer Universiade
Gymnasts at the 2022 Commonwealth Games
20th-century Malaysian women
21st-century Malaysian women
Medallists at the 2018 Commonwealth Games